SNAS Aviation (legally Saudi National Air Services Limited) was a cargo airline based in Riyadh, Saudi Arabia and operated exclusive flights for DHL International Aviation ME.

History
SNAS Aviation was established in 1979 operating scheduled services between Muharraq and Riyadh, and after the 1990s its services were expanded. The owner of SNAS was Prince Saud bin Nayef Al Saud.

Fleet

The SNAS Aviation fleet included the following aircraft (as of February 2010):

5 Boeing 727-200F

The airline previously operated the following aircraft:
2 Boeing 757-200PF
2 Convair CV-580
7 Fairchild Metro III

See also
List of defunct airlines of Saudi Arabia

References

External links

SNAS Aviation Fleet
SNAS Aviation aircraft

Airlines established in 1979
Airlines disestablished in 2014
Defunct airlines of Saudi Arabia
Cargo airlines
Saudi Arabian companies established in 1979